Jessica is an album by Gerald Wilson's Orchestra of the 80's recorded in 1982 and released on the Trend label.

Reception

AllMusic rated the album with 4 stars; in his review, Scott Yanow noted: "this is a highly enjoyable and consistently swinging album".

Track listing 
All compositions by Gerald Wilson except where noted.
 "Jessica" - 5:26
 "I Love You Madly" (Duke Ellington) - 3:36
 "Blues Bones and Bobby" - 10:24
 "Getaway" (Beloyd Taylor, Peter Cor Belenky) - 9:27
 "Sophisticated Lady" (Ellington) - 4:29
 "Don't Get Around Much Anymore" (Ellington, Bob Russell) - 3:39

Personnel 
Gerald Wilson - composer, arranger, conductor
Rick Baptist, Bobby Bryant, Oscar Brashear, Hal Espinosa, Snooky Young - trumpet
Garnett Brown, Jimmy Cleveland, Thurman Green - trombone 
Maurice Spears - bass trombone
Anthony Ortega, Jerome Richardson, Henry de Vega - alto saxophone
Roger Hogan, Harold Land, Ernie Watts - tenor saxophone
Jack Nimitz - baritone saxophone
Gerald Wiggins - piano
Harold Land, Jr. - electric piano
Milcho Leviev - keyboards
Johnny Williams - bass, electric bass
Clayton Cameron - drums

References 

Gerald Wilson albums
1983 albums
Albums arranged by Gerald Wilson
Albums conducted by Gerald Wilson